Gymnopilus aurantiobrunneus is a species of mushroom-forming fungus in the family Hymenogastraceae. It is found in China.

See also

 List of Gymnopilus species

aurantiobrunneus
Fungi of China
Fungi described in 1986